World Wide Technology, Inc. (WWT) is a privately-held technology services provider based in St. Louis, Missouri. The company has an annual revenue of $14.5 billion (the 27th largest private company in the US and the biggest black-owned company in the US) and employs over 8,000 people. WWT works in the areas of cloud computing, computer security, data centers, data analytics and artificial intelligence, computer networks, application software development, cell phone carrier networking, and consulting services.

History
World Wide Technology was founded by David Steward and Jim Kavanaugh in July 1990 as a reseller of technology equipment.

In 1994, WWT entered into a partnership with Cisco Systems to resell hardware and software. WWT also established partnerships with technology companies including Dell, Hewlett Packard Enterprise, Intel, Microsoft, NetApp, F5, Tanium and VMware.

WWT opened its first warehouse in 1996 and operates more than 20 facilities with two million square feet of warehousing, distribution and integration space.

In 1999, Telcobuy.com, LLC, was founded as separate company, owned by WWT, Steward and Kavanaugh.
In March, 2000, Telcobuy announced $27.5 million in venture capital, after revenue grew to $246 million.
Telcobuy planned an initial public offering of about $100 million, but as the dot-com bubble burst, the plan was withdrawn in the early 2000s recession. 
Starting 2001 with 440 employees, the company reduced its workforce and its founders took 40% pay cuts, while it kept operating. In January 2003, it was merged back into WWT under a holding company.

WWT created its first large-scale integration lab in St. Louis to increase capacity for secure system configuration. Additional integration labs were established in Europe and Asia, with locations in Amsterdam and Singapore opening in 2015, and Mumbai in 2019.In 2009, WWT opened its Advanced Technology Center to allow engineers, customers and partners to evaluate hardware and software. The Advanced Technology Center was made accessible online.

In 2015, WWT acquired St. Louis software company Asynchrony.

In 2020, WWT received Webby Awards in the Health & Fitness and People's Voice categories for its St. Jude Children's Research Hospital Patient Care App.

WWT has been named on Fortune's 100 Best Companies to Work For list from 2012 to 2022.

In 2021, Time named WWT among the 100 Most Influential Companies, in the "Leaders" category.

Sponsorships 
 In 2018, WWT signed a sponsorship agreement with Richard Petty Motorsports driver “Bubba” Wallace, Jr
 In 2019, WWT announced a naming rights sponsorship of Gateway Motorsports Park, now known as the World Wide Technology Raceway
 WWT also sponsors PGA golfer Graeme McDowell and PGA Tour Champions golfer Billy Andrade

References 

Information technology companies of the United States
Companies based in St. Louis County, Missouri
Technology companies established in 1990
1990 establishments in Missouri
Black-owned companies of the United States